is a Japanese former professional boxer who competed from 2006 to 2019. He was a unified light-flyweight world champion, having held the WBA title from 2014 to 2018 and the IBF and Ring magazine titles from 2017 to 2018.

Professional career

Early career
Taguchi made his professional debut on July 19, 2006, against Tomohiro Seo and won the fight by a first-round knockout. By December 28, 2009, he had amassed a 10-1 record, with four of those victories coming by way of stoppage.

In late 2011, Taguchi entered the Japanese light-flyweight contender tournament, held to determine the next Japanese light-flyweight title challenger. He faced Tetsuya Hisada in the tournament semifinals, held on July 5, 2011, and won the fight by unanimous decision. Taguchi faced Yu Kimura in the tournament finals, held on October 15, 2011, and won the fight by a sixth-round technical knockout.

Japan light-flyweight champion
Taguchi challenged the Japanese light-flyweight champion Masayuki Kuroda on March 12, 2012, at the Korakuen Hall in Tokyo, Japan. The fight was ruled a split decision draw after ten rounds were contested. Taguchi was afterwards scheduled to face Eakkasit Jaikongkaew on July 16, 2012. Eakkasit failed to make weight for the bout and was accordingly banned from competing in Japan by the JBC for a period of one year, although he was still allowed to fight Taguchi. Taguchi won the fight by a first-round knockout.

Taguchi was scheduled to fight Yuki Chinen for the vacant Japanese light-flyweight title on April 3, 2013. He won the ten-round bout by unanimous decision, with scores of 99-91, 98-92 and 97-93. During his post-fight interview, Taguchi called out the #6 ranked Japanese light-flyweight Naoya Inoue for his first title defense. His wish granted by the JBC, Taguchi was scheduled to face Inoue on August 25, 2013, in his first title defense. Taguchi lost the fight by unanimous decision, with scores of 98-92, 98-93 and 97-94.

Taguchi returned to action four months after suffering his second professional loss, to face Ryan Bito on December 31, 2013, in a 49.5 kg catchweight bout. He won the fight by unanimous decision, with scores of 78-74, 78-75 and 78-74. Taguchi was next scheduled to face the former IBF minumumweight champion Florante Condes on July 5, 2014. He won the fight by unanimous decision, narrowly edging out the former champion with scores of 77-74, 77-74 and 76-75.

Light-flyweight champion

WBA light-flyweight champion
Taguchi was scheduled to challenge Alberto Rossel for the WBA light-flyweight title on December 31, 2014, at the Ota City General Gymnasium in Tokyo, Japan. The bout presented Rossel's first title defense, after being promoted to status of undisputed champion following Kazuto Ioka's move up in weight. Taguchi won the fight by unanimous decision, with scores of 116-110, 116-111 and 117-109. He quickly overwhelmed Rossel and twice knocked him down with a body shot, in rounds eight and nine.

Taguchi made his first title defense against Kwanthai Sithmorseng on May 6, 2015, at the Ota City General Gymnasium in Tokyo, Japan. Kwanthai, a former WBA titlist at minimumweight, was ranked as the #14 light-flyweight in the WBA rankings at the time of the bout's scheduling. Taguchi won the fight by an eight-round technical knockout, stopping his opponent with repeated body shots. Prior to the stoppage, Kwanthai was knocked down in the second, fifth and seventh rounds.

Taguchi was scheduled to make the second defense of his title against the #7 ranked WBA light-flyweight Luis de la Rosa on December 31, 2015, at the Ota City General Gymnasium in Tokyo, Japan. de la Rosa retired from the fight at the end of the ninth round, after suffering a near-knockdown in the ninth round. de la Rosa was up on two of the judges scorecards at the time of the stoppage, with scores of 87-84 and 86-85, while the third judge scored the fight 87-84 for Taguchi.

Taguchi made his third title defense against the former WBA minimumweight champion Juan Jose Landaeta, who was at the time the #7 ranked WBA light-flyweight contender, on April 27, 2016. Just like his previous three title fights, the fight took place at the Ota City General Gymnasium in Tokyo, Japan. Landaeta retired from the fight at the end of the eleventh round, after being knocked down five times in the preceding rounds.

Taguchi faced yet another former WBA minimumweight champion, Ryo Miyazaki, in his fourth title defense. Taguchi was scheduled to fight the #1 ranked WBA light-flyweight contender on August 31, 2016, at the Ota City General Gymnasium in Tokyo, Japan. He won the fight by unanimous decision, with scores of 116-112, 117-111 and 119-109. Following this victory, Taguchi was awarded the August Monthly Outstanding Fighter Award by the WBA.

Taguchi made his fifth title defense against the undefeated Carlos Cañizales, who was at the time the #3 ranked WBA light-flyweight contender, on December 31, 2016. The fight was ruled a split decision draw. Judges Derek Milham and Octavio Rodriguez each awarded a 116-112 scorecard to Cañizales and Taguchi respectively, while judge Philippe Verbeke scored the fight as a 114-114 draw.

Taguchi was scheduled to make his sixth title defense against Rober Barrera on July 23, 2017, at the Ota City General Gymnasium in Tokyo, Japan. Taguchi put in a dominant performance and won the fight by a ninth-round technical knockout, 24 seconds into the round.

WBA and IBF unified champion
After successfully defending his title six times, Taguchi was scheduled to fight the IBF light-flyweight champion Milan Melindo in a title unification bout. Additionally, the vacant The Ring light-flyweight title was on the stake as well. The super fight between the two champions was set for December 31, 2017, and was contested at the Ota City General Gymnasium in Tokyo, Japan, same as all of Taguchi's previous title fights. Taguchi beat Melindo by unanimous decision, who was unable to make use of his 4-inch height and reach advantage. Two judges scored the fight 117-111 for Taguchi, while the third judge awarded him a 116-111 scorecard. He was awarded the December Monthly Outstanding Fighter Award by the WBA.

Taguchi made his first title defense as a unified light-flyweight champion against the former minimumweight unified champion Hekkie Budler on May 20, 2018. Despite coming into the fight as a favorite, and with a height and reach advantage, Taguchi lost the fight by unanimous decision, with all three judges scoring the fight 114–113 for Budler. On November 20, 2018, Taguchi announced his retirement from the sport.

Move up to flyweight
Taguchi came of his retirement in early 2019, to challenge the newly crowned WBO flyweight champion Kosei Tanaka. The fight was scheduled for March 16, 2019, and was contested at the Memorial Center in Gifu, Japan. Tanaka won the fight by unanimous decision, with two judges scoring the fight 117-111 in his favor, while the third judge awarded Tanaka a 119-109 scorecard.

Professional boxing record

See also
List of light-flyweight boxing champions
List of Japanese boxing world champions
Boxing in Japan

References

External links

1986 births
Living people
Sportspeople from Tokyo
Japanese male boxers
Light-flyweight boxers
World light-flyweight boxing champions
World Boxing Association champions
International Boxing Federation champions
The Ring (magazine) champions
21st-century Japanese people